Ribnica may refer to:

Bosnia and Herzegovina 
 Ribnica (Kakanj), a village

Croatia 
 Ribnica, Croatia, a village in central Croatia

Macedonia 
 Ribnica, Mavrovo and Rostuša, a settlement in the municipality of Mavrovo and Rostuša

Montenegro 
 Ribnica, the old name for Podgorica, the capital of Montenegro
 Ribnica (fortress), a fortress
 Ribnica (river), a river
 FK Ribnica, a football club

Serbia 
 Lake Ribnica
 Ribnica (Kraljevo), a town in City of Kraljevo
 Ribnica, a settlement in Kraljevo

Slovenia 
 Municipality of Ribnica, a municipality
 Municipality of Ribnica na Pohorju, a municipality
 Ribnica, Brežice, a settlement in the Municipality of Brežice
 Ribnica na Pohorju, a settlement in the Municipality of Ribnica na Pohorju
 Ribnica, Pivka, a settlement in the Municipality of Pivka
 Ribnica, Ribnica, a settlement in the Municipality of Ribnica
 RD Ribnica, a handball club based in Ribnica, Ribnica
 Spodnja Ribnica, a hamlet of Ribnica, Brežice in the Municipality of Brežice
 Zgornja Ribnica, a hamlet of Ribnica, Brežice in the Municipality of Brežice

See also
 Rybnica (disambiguation)
 Rîbnița